cAMP and cAMP-inhibited cGMP 3',5'-cyclic phosphodiesterase 10A is an enzyme that in humans is encoded by the PDE10A gene.

Various cellular responses are regulated by the second messengers cAMP and cGMP. Phosphodiesterases, such as PDE10A, eliminate cAMP- and cGMP-mediated intracellular signaling by hydrolyzing the cyclic nucleotide to the corresponding nucleoside 5-prime monophosphate.

Inhibitors 

 Compound 96: IC50 = 700 pM, high selectivity against all other members of the PDE family 
 Papaverine
 PF-2545920
 TAK-063: IC50 = 300 pM
 AMG 579
 CPL500036

Research 
Preliminary evidence indicates a possible link between PDE10A expression and obesity in mice and humans. PDE10A is a regulatory protein involved in the signaling of the striatum, a region of the brain important for controlling movement and cognition. Dysfunction of the striatum has been linked to the development of schizophrenia. Inhibition of PDE10A has been identified as a potential treatment for the disorder, and an inhibitor compound (MK-8189) is as of February 2023 in Phase 2b clinical development for the treatment of schizophrenia.

References

Further reading 

 
 
 
 
 
 

EC 3.1.4